In professional wrestling, kayfabe is the portrayal of staged events within the industry as "real" or "true",  specifically the portrayal of competition, rivalries, and relationships between participants as being genuine and not staged. The term kayfabe has evolved to also become a code word of sorts for maintaining this "reality" within the direct or indirect presence of the general public.

Kayfabe, in the United States, is often seen as the suspension of disbelief that is used to create the non-wrestling aspects of promotions, such as feuds, angles, and gimmicks in a manner similar to other forms of fictional entertainment. In relative terms, a wrestler breaking kayfabe during a show would be likened to an actor breaking character on-camera. Also, since wrestling is performed in front of a live audience, whose interaction with the show is crucial to its success, kayfabe can be compared to the fourth wall in acting, since hardly any conventional fourth wall exists to begin with. In general, everything in a professional wrestling show is to some extent scripted, or "kayfabe", even though at times it is portrayed as real-life.

Kayfabe was fiercely maintained for decades, but with the advent of the Internet wrestling community, and the sports entertainment movement, the pro-wrestling industry has become less concerned with protecting so-called backstage secrets and typically maintains kayfabe only during the shows. It is occasionally broken during shows, usually when dealing with genuine injuries during a match or paying tribute to wrestlers.

Definition
Kayfabe is a shorthand term that involves acknowledging the staged, scripted nature of professional wrestling, as opposed to a competitive sport, despite being presented as authentic. Initially, people "in the business" (either wrestlers or those working behind the scenes) used the term kayfabe as a code among those in the wrestling profession, discussing matters in public without revealing the scripted nature. As a concept, kayfabe involves both the fact that matches are scripted and that wrestlers portray characters for their shows. Unlike actors who portray their characters only when on set or on stage, professional wrestlers often stay "in character" outside the shows, especially when interacting with fans, trying to preserve the illusion of professional wrestling. In contrast, something that is not kayfabe, be it a fight or a statement, is referred to as a "shoot".

The term kayfabe was often used as a warning to other wrestlers that someone who was not "in the know" was in the vicinity. This could include wrestlers' family members who had not been clued into the scripted nature of professional wrestling. An example of kayfabe being kept even from family members was illustrated in an article describing how in the 1970s, the wife of James Harris (known under the ring name Kamala) was celebrating that her husband had just won a $5,000 prize as he won a battle royal; not realizing that the prize money was simply a storyline or kayfabe.

The term kayfabe itself can be used in a variety of contexts, as an adjective, for instance, when referring to a "kayfabe interview", where the person being interviewed remains "in character", or when describing someone as a "kayfabe girlfriend", implying that she is playing a role, but is not actually romantically involved with that particular person. A person can also be said to be "kayfabing" someone, by presenting storylines and rivalries as real.

Etymology
According to the Oxford English Dictionary, the earliest known written evidence of the word "kayfabe" is from the Wrestling Observer Newsletter Yearbook for 1988, though the term is believed to be much older. Various sources have suggested different origins, but the actual origin is not known with certainty. One theory suggests that it was derived from a word manipulation of the term "be fake" (à la pig latin and other argots), designed to conceal the true meaning. 

Another theory claims that there actually was a wrestler called "Kay Fabian" who was mute. Neither claim has ever been substantiated. Another theory suggests that the term derives from the expression "keep cavey", from the Latin verb caveo, which means "look out for"; this phrase was used throughout Britain and by Jews living in East London between World War I and World War II. According to that theory, many US promoters and wrestlers at that time were of Eastern European origin and many had heavy accents, leading to the term being transformed into "kayfabe".

History
While professional wrestling has been staged, or planned, from the time it was a sideshow attraction, the scripted nature of the performances has been hinted at over time. In 1934 a show held at Wrigley Field in Chicago billed one of the matches as "the last great shooting match", subtly disclosing that the other matches were kayfabe (in reality, even the "shooting" match was scripted). In 1957 comedian Groucho Marx described watching wrestlers "practice their match", hinting at the scripted nature of professional wrestling.

While the scripted nature of professional wrestling was an open secret, it was not generally acknowledged by people in the business. Often wrestlers and promoters would make sure that on-screen rivals were not seen eating or traveling together between shows and so on. There were a few occasional mistakes at the time, such as an incident in 1987 in which police arrested The Iron Sheik and Hacksaw Jim Duggan, supposed rivals in an upcoming match at Madison Square Garden, as they sat together in a car drinking and using cocaine. The first public acknowledgment by a major insider of the staged nature of professional wrestling came in 1989 when World Wrestling Federation owner Vince McMahon testified before the New Jersey State Senate that wrestling was not a competitive sport. The admission on McMahon's part was to avoid interference from state athletic commissions and to avoid paying the taxation some states placed on income from athletic events held in that state, as well as to avoid the need to meet the requirement of having to employ medical professionals standing by, as was generally mandatory for legitimate contact sports involving substantial possibility of injury.   The era of professional wrestling since then has been described by analysts as "neo-kayfabe", in which storylines can become real life and vice versa, thus blurring the distinction between fact and fiction and giving the audience complicity in creating the spectacle.

Faces and heels

The characters assumed by wrestlers can be distinguished into two alignments: faces and heels.

Faces, short for "babyfaces", are hero-type characters whose personalities are crafted to elicit the support of the audience through traits such as humility, patriotism, a hard-working nature, determination, and reciprocal love of the crowd. Faces usually win their matches on the basis of their technical skills and are sometimes portrayed as underdogs to enhance the story.

Heels are villainous or antagonistic characters, whose personalities are crafted to elicit a negative response from the audience. They often embrace traditionally negative traits such as narcissism, egomania, unprompted rage, sadism, and general bitterness. Though not as prevalent today, xenophobic ethnic and racial stereotypes, in particular, those inspired by the Axis powers of World War II and Communist countries during the Cold War era, were commonly used in North American wrestling as heel-defining traits. Another angle of a heel could be approached from a position of authority; examples include Big Boss Man, a corrections officer; Mike Rotunda as Irwin R. Schyster, a federal tax collector; Jacques Rougeau wearing RCMP-inspired dress as The Mountie; and Glenn Jacobs (who would later become famous as Kane) as Isaac Yankem, a dentist. Heels can also be other characters held in low esteem by the public such as a repossession agent (a role played by Barry Darsow as Repo Man). Heels typically inspire boos from the audience and often employ underhanded tactics, such as cheating and exploiting technicalities in their fighting strategies, or use overly aggressive styles to cause (the perception of) excess pain or injury to their opponents.

A wrestler may change from face to heel (or vice versa) in an event known as a turn, or gradually transition from one to the other over the course of a long storyline. Wrestlers like André the Giant, Roddy Piper, Hulk Hogan, and Randy Savage could work across the entire spectrum and often gain new fans as a result of each "turn".

Matches are usually organized between a heel and a face, but the distinction between the two types may be blurred as a given character's storyline reaches a peak or becomes more complicated. In recent years, several wrestlers became characters that were neither faces nor heels, but somewhere in between—or alternating between both—earning them the term "tweener", reflecting the rise in popular culture of the concept of the Antihero; such characters often display the underhand tactics and aggression of a traditional heel, but do so in ways sympathetic to the audience, or within the confines of some internal code e.g. only fighting obvious heel characters, criticising authority figures. Particularly successful tweeners can find over time that they are enthusiastically adopted as 'faces' by the audience without changing their tweener or antihero characterisation e.g. Stone Cold Steve Austin and Shawn Michaels.

Despite the wrestlers' character settings, the crowd may not react accordingly. This may be due to booking issues or a particular crowd's tendency to react positively to heels, and negatively (or at least in an indifferent manner) to faces. A strong audience reaction against the original push of a character can occasionally lead to booking a 'turn' where the character begins to act in line with the audience reaction; this can help resetting a character with an audience, as occurred when the audience widely rejected a traditional 'face' character, Rocky Maivia, who transitioned the character with huge success to a 'heel' as The Rock. 

The divide also can be separated by fan demographics, where older male fans tend to cheer for heels and boo faces, while kids and female fans tend to cheer for faces and boo the heels, especially with John Cena and Roman Reigns.

Uses

Relationships
Many storylines make use of kayfabe romantic relationships between two performers. Very often, both participants have other real-life relationships, and the relationship between the two is simply a storyline. More than once, kayfabe romantic relationships have occurred alongside real-life relationships, such as between Matt Hardy and Lita; these real-life relationships may occasionally develop into a real-life marriage (e.g., Triple H and Stephanie McMahon, who married in 2003, more than a year after their kayfabe marriage ended). During the early 21st century, this kayfabe practice has given way to reality in the WWE, largely due to the creation of the reality television program Total Divas where four "legit" (legally binding) weddings have occurred: Natalya and Tyson Kidd, Brie Bella and Daniel Bryan, Naomi and Jimmy Uso, and Eva Marie and her fiancé Jonathan. In TNA, after American Wolves disbanded, Eddie Edwards and Davey Richards and their "legit" wives, Alisha Edwards and Angelina Love-Richards wrestled against each other.

Tag teams of wrestlers, who may or may not look alike, are often presented as relatives, though they are not actually related. Examples include The Brothers of Destruction (The Undertaker and Kane), The Holly Cousins (Hardcore Holly, Crash Holly, and Molly Holly) and The Dudley Brothers. The "Brother" tag team concept was commonly used during the "territory years" (1950s-1980s) as a means to develop young talent, by pairing them with a veteran wrestler and giving the younger wrestler a "rub" by virtue of the association, such as the Valliant Brothers or the Fargo Brothers where none of the "brothers" were actually related.

Injuries
A wrestler or a promotion uses kayfabe in regard to injuries in one of two ways; "selling" a fake injury as part of a storyline, or they come up with a storyline reason to explain the absence of someone due to a legitimate injury. Sometimes a wrestler will be kept off shows to demonstrate the severity of what happened to them previously as part of a storyline. Prior to the spread of the internet, this was a common tactic used to explain the absence of a wrestler when said wrestler would tour Japan or was unable to appear on specific shows. If a wrestler appears on a show after a "brutal" attack they would "sell" the injury by limping or having their arm heavily bandaged and so on. In other instances, when a wrestler was legitimately injured either during a match or during training, a storyline would play out where a heel would attack the wrestler and "injure" them to give the impression that the injury was due to the attack. This normally would lead to the injured wrestler returning, later on, to "settle the score".

Promoters have used in-ring accidents that led to injuries, or in extreme cases death, as a way to make a heel even more hated and unpopular. In 1971 Alberto Torres died three days after wrestling Ox Baker. Evidence indicated that Torres died of a ruptured appendix, but Baker's Heart punch finishing move was the kayfabe reason; the death was worked into Baker's wrestling persona by the promoters making Baker the most hated heel in the territory at the time. Acts exploiting personal tragedy or death became less and less prevalent by the turn of the century with fans being more aware of the worked nature of professional wrestling.

On the other hand, due to the risks involved in professional wrestling, some measures are still in place to let the crowd and commentators know if the wrestlers are legitimately injured in serious or dangerous spots.  The injured wrestler can squeeze the opponent or referee within short timeframe before giving thumbs up or wave to the crowd, if possible. If they cannot do so in a timely manner, the referee will cross their arms above their head to signal for medical help, often ending the match. The signal has been used as part of kayfabe in order to create drama partway through the match, such as the main event of TLC: Tables, Ladders & Chairs (2017).

Contracts, employment status, and suspensions
Wrestlers being publicly "fired" is a popular storytelling device, often for the fired wrestler to return under a mask or "earn their job" back through a match. In the days where the National Wrestling Alliance territories were at their height some wrestlers would travel from territory to territory, often using a Loser Leaves Town match to wrap up a storyline in the specific territory. At times a wrestler will make a surprise debut for a company, with the storyline presenting that the wrestler in question does not actually work for the company.

In NXT, kayfabe is often broken post-match when a wrestler is promoted to the main roster, with the rest of the roster applauding them, regardless of storyline relationships. Before then, these breaks are apparent when they are promoted from OVW, or when they retired. Most notably, The Undertaker broke kayfabe as a mysterious Deadman, as he hugged and kneeled down to offer his respects to Ric Flair on his retirement ceremony. Since then, Daniel Bryan's rivals (notably The Miz and Brock Lesnar) broke kayfabe in interviews and on Twitter applauding his decisions to retire, although their rivalry resumed after Daniel Bryan returned as Smackdown General Manager (the position of "General Manager" itself being a kayfabe on-screen authority figure), and escalated to a point where Daniel Bryan legitimately left Talking Smack because The Miz gave a shoot interview that got personal.

Breaks
There have been several examples of breaking kayfabe throughout wrestling history, although exactly what constitutes "breaking" is not clearly defined. It is rare for kayfabe to be dispensed with totally and the events acknowledged as scripted. Often the "break" may be implied or through an allusion (for example calling a wrestler by his/her real name) and standards tend to vary as to what is a break. In the WWF during and after the Attitude Era, the line between kayfabe and reality was often blurred. With the growth of the industry and its exposure on the Internet and DVD and videos, kayfabe may be broken more regularly. Whereas in the past it was extremely rare for a wrestler or other involved person to recognize the scripted nature of events even in outside press or media, WWE DVDs and WWE.com routinely give news and acknowledge real life. In the case of the former, vignettes may feature ostensible adversaries and allies talking about each other, and the angles and storylines they worked and their opinions on them. On WWE.com, the real-life news is often given which may contradict storylines.

Before the Attitude Era and the advent of the Internet, publications such as WWF Magazine, and television programs broke kayfabe only to acknowledge major real-life events involving current, or retired wrestlers, such as a death (for instance, the death of Ernie Roth, who was billed as "The Grand Wizard of Wrestling"), divorce (e.g., Randy Savage and Miss Elizabeth) or life-threatening accident (such as Brutus Beefcake's 1990 parasailing accident), especially if said event received mass mainstream coverage. In addition, when WWF top officials and employees were facing allegations of anabolic steroid abuse and sexual harassment during the early 1990s, Vince McMahon responded via a series of videotaped comments defending his company and employees, and several full-page advertisements rebutting the allegations appeared in WWF Magazine and the New York Times.

In the Reality Era (2014 and onwards, specifically after WrestleMania XXX) and the era of social media, kayfabe is often broken when wrestlers go on tour. Feuding stars in storylines can be seen being civil to each other when they are not wrestling. Off-ring persona can be strikingly different from the in-ring character with less disapproval.

Storylines becoming real life
In some instances, the use of kayfabe to protect a storyline or a wrestler led to real life events mirroring the storylines.

While working as a booker for WCW, Kevin Sullivan conceived an angle where Woman (Nancy Daus Sullivan, Sullivan's wife both on-screen and off), would leave his character for Chris Benoit. Sullivan insisted that the Daus and Benoit should travel together to preserve kayfabe for the general public. This resulted in Sullivan's wife actually leaving him for Benoit when the two developed a real-life romantic relationship during their time together. Nancy ultimately married Benoit in 2000.

Brian Pillman developed a "Loose Cannon" persona for himself while in WCW in 1996, conspiring with Vice President Eric Bischoff and booker Kevin Sullivan. Pillman's character was based entirely on straddling the fine line of kayfabe, presenting it as if he had legitimate problems with WCW management. He would engage in on-camera actions that seemed to be unscripted, even to the other performers, and even breached kayfabe protocol when he addressed Sullivan on air as "bookerman".

When Triple H and Stephanie McMahon entered into a kayfabe marriage in late 1999, Triple H and McMahon started dating in real life, and continued to do so after their onscreen marriage ended in 2002; the two eventually married in real life in 2003. The Catholic priest at the wedding, not aware of the workings of the wrestling business, initially refused to marry the two when he found out about the kayfabe "wedding" from a choir boy who was also a wrestling fan. Linda McMahon later had to explain to the priest the difference between WWE programming and real life, allowing the marriage to go through. Afterward, the real-life marriage became an open secret on television before being acknowledged by Triple H in 2009.

Real-life events are written into storylines
The opposite also holds true, where the kayfabe story is based on, or as a result of, real-life events, from disclosing relationship status to starting family feuds.

CM Punk's 2011 pipe bomb has claimed that Vince McMahon has the potential to be a billionaire, when in fact, Vince was at one point, before it was revealed he lost $750 million of his $1.6 billion net worth, losing 350 million in a day due to WWE's over-valued stock price and lower-than-expected WWE Network subscribers (his net worth currently stands at a reported $2 billion). He also referred to John Cena and Cena's beloved Boston-based sports teams as heels because they are all no longer underdogs, and they have all forged dynasties and championship teams in their respective sports (Boston Celtics, Boston Red Sox, Boston Bruins, New England Patriots).

Kurt Angle had legitimately won an Olympic Gold Medal for Freestyle Wrestling, and built heat as a heel because he was still not being recognized by his peers or the crowd. He also revealed his legit injury history and his separation from his first wife, and they divorced in 2008.

Edge, Lita and Matt Hardy engaged in a feud in mid-2005, after Lita had cheated on with Edge (who was friends with Hardy), which caused Matt to be legitimately fired due to social media misconduct. He was rehired after fan backlash and the love triangle became a highlight in their storyline rivalry. 

In June 2017, Big Cass broke away from Enzo Amore and cited that Enzo's off-ring antics made him a distraction in the locker room. On September 11, 2017, The Miz and Maryse revealed they are expecting their first child, having previously been mocked by John Cena for not having children after being married.

On the same day, Enzo Amore had been criticized by The Miz about him being thrown off the tour bus and banned from the locker room as he was a negative influence, while Amore answered back by saying The Miz's initial heel run in the WWE was because he wasn't a great in-ring performer despite having great mic skills. Under this feud, The Miz and Maryse also blurred the face/heel divide as they are built as faces in the feud when they are normally heels in other feuds and storylines.

On May 10, 2020, Asuka won the Money In The Bank briefcase, which normally would allow her to compete against WWE Raw Women's Champion up to a calendar year from the day she won the briefcase. This would have continued a feud with Becky Lynch, who held the title for 399 days, but she surrendered the title to Asuka after she became pregnant with Seth Rollins, then her fiancé and later her husband.

Asuka broke kayfabe by hugging and congratulating Lynch when Asuka found out that she was going "to become a mother". With the title, Asuka also became only the second Women's Grand Slam Champion, which required her to win the NXT Women's title, the Smackdown and Raw Women's titles and the Women's Tag Team Championship. Unlike Bayley, Asuka had also won a Women's Royal Rumble match before. Lynch was written out of storylines as she went on hiatus. It was later revealed that Asuka's reactions were legit and genuine despite being a heel, as the storyline was changed on short notice. This is also true for the members of the Raw roster that were faces at the time, when they also congratulated her on the news. Rollins was not included as he was a heel at the time of the announcement.

On May 12, 2020, Sami Zayn's WWE Intercontinental Championship was stripped due to him refraining from competing during the COVID-19 pandemic.

Real-life events are written out of storylines 
Last-minute injuries, contracts, and marital statuses can also change the storyline or how a segment is presented. When Enzo Amore's contract was terminated due to withholding information about his sexual assault investigation, his romantic storyline with Nia Jax was scrapped, while she has moved to have the storyline with Drew Gulak. 
The segments for Raw 25 has also changed on hours' notice due to Jimmy Fallon unable to arrive in New York in time for pre-taped segments for Raw 25 where he was supposed to interview the current and former GM's in Raw and SmackDown, but instead, they only waved in a Hall-of-Fame-like lineup.

Outside professional wrestling 
Kayfabe, while not referred to as such, has existed in other areas of show business, especially in feuds. For instance, the feuds between comedians Jack Benny and Fred Allen, and comedian/actor Bob Hope and singer/actor Bing Crosby were totally fake; in real life, Benny and Allen were best friends while Hope and Crosby were also close friends. A more recent example is the "feud" between talk show host Jimmy Kimmel and actor Matt Damon which has been a running joke on Jimmy Kimmel Live! for many years and was even referenced when Kimmel hosted the 89th Academy Awards. In reality, the two are friends, and in 2013 the feud was used as a springboard for Damon guest-hosting an episode of Kimmel's show (while Kimmel himself was left tied to a chair off to the side of the set). Other examples of kayfabe rivalries include that between Dwayne Johnson and Kevin Hart, and that of Hugh Jackman and Ryan Reynolds.

It has long been claimed that kayfabe has been used in American politics, especially in election campaigns, Congress, and the White House.  In interviews as Governor of Minnesota, former wrestler Jesse Ventura often likened Washington to wrestling when he said that politicians "pretend to hate each other in public, then go out to dinner together."

An example of kayfabe being broken outside of professional wrestling was in 2004, during the I Love Bees alternative reality game used to promote Halo 2, when one of the calltakers who voiced the AI that had hacked the website in the game's storyline broke character to tell a caller to run to safety, since he was in the middle of Hurricane Ivan.

In response to a request for suggestions of the single scientific concept with the greatest potential to enhance human understanding, Eric Weinstein proposed the system of kayfabe: If we are to take selection more seriously within humans, we may fairly ask what rigorous system would be capable of tying together an altered reality of layered falsehoods in which absolutely nothing can be assumed to be as it appears. Such a system, in continuous development for more than a century, is known to exist and now supports an intricate multi-billion dollar business empire of pure hokum. It is known to wrestling's insiders as "Kayfabe".

Crowd as pseudo characters 
In the WWE Universe era, the crowd also can be spontaneously used, mostly as a heel, either to distract promo, build more heat to heels, or used to distract referees on their count-outs to force a result, even when they have no physical power or rights to fight the wrestlers. Wrestlers can only react by shooting on them, either as scripted or as an improvisation. At WrestleMania 34, a 10-year-old boy named "Nicholas" was hand-picked by Braun Strowman as his tag-team partner for the WWE Tag Team title match. Strowman and Nicholas won the Tag-Team title, but it was later revealed that Nicholas is the son of the match referee, John Cone.

In fiction
The 2008 film The Wrestler portrays an aging wrestler with failing health and waning fame planning a re-match with his historic heel. Throughout the film, the fictional nature of the bouts is depicted openly, including a scene where a wrestler intentionally cuts his forehead with a razor to make the hit seem worse than what it was. Nevertheless, the physical damage suffered by the wrestlers is depicted as real and oftentimes serious.

See also

 Glossary of professional wrestling terms
 Trade secret
 Truthiness
 Simulacra and Simulation

References

Further reading
  (Information about the origin of the word.)

External links 
 

Professional wrestling slang
Secrecy
Trade secrets